Svingin' with Svend is an album by American musician David Grisman and Danish musician Svend Asmussen, released in 1987. It is attributed to the David Grisman Quintet featuring Svend Asmussen.

All songs were recorded live with the exception of "Lap-Nils Polska" and "Jitterbug Waltz", which were recorded at Bay View Studios in Richmond, California in 1987. "It Don't Mean a Thing" and "Spirit Feel" were not included on the initial LP release.

In an interview with Mandozine, Grisman stated: "That album comprised both live and studio cuts. The live material was recorded at a week-long engagement at Fat Tuesdays, a jazz club in NYC that Stan Getz's son Steve managed. Les Paul used to play there every Monday night. One night during the engagement Toots came by and Svend invited him to sit in. I believe we played Milt Jackson's "Spirit Feel" which is included on the CD version (not the LP). It was very exciting to be a part of that meeting of two very kindred spirits and long-time friends."

Track listing
 "Svingin' with Svend" (David Grisman) – 4:02
 "Nadja" (Svend Asmussen) – 6:24
 "Lap-Nils' Polska" (Traditional, arr. Asmussen) – 8:24
 "It Don't Mean a Thing" – 6:35
 "Swing Mineur" (Django Reinhardt, Stéphane Grappelli) – 6:38
 "Jitterbug Waltz" (Fats Waller) – 6:20
 "The Spirit-Feel" (Milt Jackson) – 9:29
 "Nuages" (Reinhardt) – 6:02

Personnel
David Grisman – mandolin
Svend Asmussen – violin
Dimitri Vandellos – guitar
James Kerwin – double bass
George Marsh – drums, percussion, kalimba
Production notes:
David Grisman – producer, mixing
Craig Miller – producer, engineer
Bob Shumaker – engineer
Paul Stubbelbine – engineer
Tom Anderson – engineer
Greg Fulginiti – mastering
Rhonda Voo – cover illustration
Thomas Boss – photography

Chart positions

References

External links
Svend Asmussen: The Phenomenal Danish Fiddler
Grateful Dead Family Discography

David Grisman live albums
1987 live albums
Live jazz albums